Hemilophus dimidiaticornis is a species of beetle in the family Cerambycidae. It was described by Audinet-Serville in 1835. It is known from Paraguay, Brazil, and Argentina.

References

Hemilophini
Beetles described in 1835